The fourteenth government of Israel was formed by Golda Meir on 17 March 1969, following the death of Prime Minister Levi Eshkol on 26 February. She kept the same national unity government coalition, including the newly formed Alignment alliance of the Labor Party and Mapam, as well as Gahal, the National Religious Party, the Independent Liberals, Poalei Agudat Yisrael, Progress and Development, Cooperation and Brotherhood. The only change to the cabinet was the scrapping of the Minister of Information post, with the previous post-holder Yisrael Galili becoming a Minister without Portfolio instead.

The government served until the formation of the fifteenth government by Meir on 15 December 1969, following the October elections.

Cabinet members

1 Gvati and Carmel had been elected to the Knesset on the Alignment list, but resigned their seats in 1966.

2 Kol had been elected to the Knesset on the Independent Liberals list, but had resigned after being appointed to the cabinet.

3 Although Barzilai and Bentov were not Knesset members, both were members of Mapam.

4 Although Shapira was not an MK at the time, he had previously been an MK for Mapai, and was elected to the next Knesset as a member of the Alignment.

References

External links
Sixth Knesset: Government 14 Knesset website

 14
1969 establishments in Israel
1969 disestablishments in Israel
Cabinets established in 1969
Cabinets disestablished in 1969
1969 in Israeli politics
 14
Golda Meir